Tun Hajah Rahah binti Mohamed Noah (Jawi: راحة بنت محمد نوح‎; 11 June 1933 – 18 December 2020) was the wife of the 2nd Malaysian Prime Minister Tun Abdul Razak Hussein (1922–1976) and the mother of former Prime Minister Najib Razak. She was the daughter of Mohamed Noah Omar, 1st Speaker of the Dewan Rakyat (1897–1991).

Biography
Rahah was born on 11 June 1933 in Muar, Johor. She was the youngest of Mohamed Noah Omar's ten children. While attending secondary school in Johor Bahru, Rahah was introduced to Abdul Razak Hussein, by then already an active member of the United Malays National Organisation (UMNO), by Taib Andak, a friend of Abdul Razak while studying in London. They married on 4 September 1952.

Abdul Razak became the second Prime Minister of Malaysia in 1970. As the prime minister's spouse, she served as President of the Girl Guides Association of Malaysia and patron of the Muslim Women's Action Organisation (Pertiwi). In 1976, Razak died in office, leaving Rahah widowed at the relatively young age of 43.

She was the chancellor of Universiti Tun Abdul Razak, the university founded in honour of her husband. Since Abdul Razak was the prime minister who established diplomatic relations with the People's Republic of China, all PRC ambassadors made a courtesy call on Rahah upon arriving in Malaysia.

In an interview conducted in 2011, Rahah said she spent most of her time attending religious classes with friends.

Death
Tun Rahah died on 18 December 2020 at the Prince Court Medical Centre in Kuala Lumpur following a short illness, at the age of 87. She was laid to rest at the Makam Pahlawan (Heroes' Mausoleum) near Masjid Negara, Kuala Lumpur beside the grave of her sister Tun Suhailah Mohamed Noah, widow of third Prime Minister Tun Hussein Onn, who died on 4 October 2014.

Family
Abdul Razak and Rahah had five children:
 Najib Razak (born 1953), the sixth Prime Minister of Malaysia. In 2020, Najib was convicted of corruption in relation to the 1MDB scandal during his premiership.
 Ahmad Johari (born 1954)
 Mohd Nizam (born 1958)
 Mohd Nazim (born 1962) businessman, husband to former tv presenter and AIDIJUMA entrepreneur Norjuma Habib Mohammed
 Mohd Nazir (born 1966), the former chief executive of CIMB, one of the largest financial services companies in South-East Asia. Current Chairman of Ikhlas Capital.

Rahah's sister, Suhailah, was married to Abdul Razak's successor as prime minister, Tun Hussein Onn.

Honours

Honours of Malaysia
  :
  Grand Commander of the Order of Loyalty to the Crown of Malaysia (SSM) – Tun (1976)
  :
  Knight Commander of the Order of the Star of Sarawak (PNBS) – Dato Sri (2002)
  :
  Grand Knight of the Order of the Crown of Pahang (SIMP) – formerly Dato', now Dato' Indera (1973)
  :
  Grand Commander of the Order of Kinabalu (SPDK) – Datuk Seri Panglima (1974)

Places named after her
Several places were named after her, including:
Taman Tun Rahah, Bukit Katil, Malacca
Dewan Besar Tun Rahah, Kuala Lumpur
Masjid Ar-Rahah, Kampung Kerinchi, Kuala Lumpur
SMKA Tun Hajah Rahah, Sabak Bernam, Selangor

In popular culture
Rahah has been portrayed in a documentary, theater and films. She was portrayed by Fauziah Latiff in the theater Tun Razak Musical (2010) and a film played by Faezah Elai in Tanda Putera (2013).

See also 
 Spouse of the Prime Minister of Malaysia

References

1933 births
2020 deaths
People from Muar
People from Johor
Malaysian people of Malay descent
Malaysian people of Bugis descent
Spouses of prime ministers of Malaysia
Spouses of Deputy Prime Ministers of Malaysia
Grand Commanders of the Order of Loyalty to the Crown of Malaysia
Grand Commanders of the Order of Kinabalu
Knights Commander of the Most Exalted Order of the Star of Sarawak